Memphis City FC were an American soccer team based in Memphis, Tennessee which played in USL League Two. The team was founded in 2015 and played its inaugural season in 2016 in the National Premier Soccer League. The team competed for a rivalry trophy called the "Volunteer Shield". The four Tennessee teams Memphis City FC, Nashville FC, Chattanooga FC, and Knoxville Force play against one another twice throughout the season. The team with the most points per win/tie, wins the trophy.

History 
Memphis City FC was founded on May 27, 2015, with the intention of bringing high-level soccer to the city of Memphis and to advance the cause of Memphis soccer nationally. Following several months of planning and set-up, the club was officially announced to the public on November 4, 2015, when it was revealed that they had won a place in the NPSL for the 2016 season.

Badge and colors 
The badge of the club consists of a stylized capitals "MCFC" contained within concentric rings, the club's name written again in full within the rings, and the design topped off with two small Egyptian pyramids which represent the namesake of the club's home city, being Memphis, Egypt. The design bears strong similarities to that of Major League Soccer side New York City FC, with Memphis City's management admitting that NYCFC sister club Manchester City of the Premier League in England influenced the naming of the NPSL team, although the two sides share neither ownership, management nor affiliation.

The colors of the club, in contrast, are similar to the Maroon and Orange of Serie A side A.S. Roma, which the club again cites as a primary influence on the founders, stating that they additionally represent a contrast to the traditional blues and greens of other nearby soccer sides.

The jerseys used by Memphis City FC are supplied by Hummel Sports and the jersey sponsor is Toyota. Their home jersey boasts a maroon base with white accents and the away jersey is white and the I-40 cup boasts a sky blue body and white accents.

Stadium 
The club played its home games at Mike Rose Soccer Complex, in a 2,500 capacity stadium on the site, lying a short distance to the east of the city. Toward the end of the 2016 season the team moved to Christian Brothers High School's Tom Nix Stadium. They now play their home games there at 5900 Walnut Grove, seating 3,000.

Awards 2016 
Santiago Moore of Memphis City FC won the 2016 Volunteer Shield Golden Boot. Moore finished the competition for Tennessee's premier club with 5 goals and helped guide MCFC and their MCFC Rogue Squadron to a respectable second place finish in the derby in Memphis' inaugural season.
 Volunteer Golden Boot
 NPSL SE Conference Player of the Week (multiple times)
 Dalton State scholarship offer

Humberto Paelez
 Voted NPSL SE Player of the Week (multiple times)

Jack Skahan
 Youngest player ever (17 yo) to score in the NPSL SE Conference

Cameron Woodfin
 Southern Conference Men's Soccer Player of the Week

Hayden Hamilton (16 Y/O)
 Youngest player to play in NPSL Southeast Conference

Conference 
In 2016 MCFC was a part of the SouthEastern Conference. It consisted of 6 teams. Nashville FC, Chattanooga FC, Knoxville Force, New Orleans, Birmingham Hammers, and Memphis City FC. In 2017 the Conference expanded and added 4 more teams and divided the conference into two divisions, the East and West. In the East Asheville City FC, Atlanta Silverbacks, FC Carolina Discoveries, Georgia Revolution, and Knoxville Force. In the West Birmingham Hammers, Chattanooga FC, Inter-Nashville FC, Memphis City FC, and New Orleans Jesters.

Regular season 2016 record

(** Represents I-40 CUP) (* Represents Conference Play)

Post-season 2016

Regular season 2017 record

(~ Represents I-40 CUP) (* Represents Conference Play) (** Represents West Conference Play)

Year-by-year

References

External links 
 

National Premier Soccer League teams
2015 establishments in Tennessee
Association football clubs established in 2015
Association football clubs disestablished in 2018
Soccer clubs in Tennessee